Italy competed at the 2017 World Championships in Athletics in London, United Kingdom, from 4–13 August 2017.

Medalists

Finalists
Italy national athletics team ranked 33rd (with only two finalists, the lowest score in 16 éditions) in the IAAF placing table. Rank obtained by assigning eight points in the first place and so on to the eight finalists.

Results
The Italian national athletics team at the 2017 World Championships in Athletics will consist of 36 athletes, 18 men and 18 women.

Men (18)

Women (18)

References

External links
Italian team

Nations at the 2017 World Championships in Athletics
World Championships in Athletics
Italy at the World Championships in Athletics